Lizard Hill is a narrow, curving rock ridge,  high, standing  southwest of Trepassey Bay and  east of Ridge Peak, on Tabarin Peninsula, Antarctica. The hill was probably first seen by the Swedish Antarctic Expedition, 1901–04, under Otto Nordenskjöld, and was first charted in 1946 by the Falkland Islands Dependencies Survey, who applied the descriptive name.

References

Hills of Trinity Peninsula